The Bm 4/4 is a class of heavy diesel shunting locomotives built for Swiss Federal Railways. 46 examples were built between 1960 and 1970, numbered 18401 to 18446, and a limited number remain in service. Starting in 2006, the class was slowly being replaced by new Vossloh-built locomotives.

See also
 List of stock used by Swiss Federal Railways

Bm 4 4
Diesel-electric locomotives of Switzerland
Standard gauge locomotives of Switzerland
Railway locomotives introduced in 1960